Peter Madach (born February 26, 1963) is a Swedish former professional ice hockey forward who spent most of his career in the GET-ligaen, but also played parts of his career in the Swedish Elite League with HV71. He was appointed "Junior player of the Year" within Swedish ice hockey following the 1979–1980 season. He was drafted into the National Hockey League by the Calgary Flames 78th overall in the 1981 NHL Entry Draft. He has represented the Swedish national junior team two times internationally, both at the IIHF World Junior Championship, winning 1 gold medal in West Germany in early January 1981 and the other one he returned home to Sweden empty-handed.

References

External links

Living people
Swedish ice hockey forwards
Calgary Flames draft picks
HV71 players
1963 births